Robert Siegel is a professor at Stanford University with appointments in the Department of Microbiology and Immunology, The Program in Human Biology, the Center for African Studies, and the Woods Institute for the Environment. For more than 20 years, he served as the Course Director of the Infectious Disease component of the preclinical curriculum. He has taught the following Sophomore College courses: The Stanford Safari (2009 and 2013), Smallpox: Lethal Legacy, Forbidding Future (2010), The Coming Influenza Pandemic (2011), and Measles Sneezes, Things That go Mumps in the Night (2012), and Viruses in the News (2014, 2016, 2018, 2021). Dr. Siegel also teaches a course called Humans and Viruses, which is a curriculum that teaches undergraduate students about all known human viruses. He has led Bing Overseas Study Program (BOSP) overseas seminars to Tanzania, England, Madagascar, the Pantanal, and Tasmania. Siegel served as the second Stanford Tree from 1977-1978.

He is also a docent at Jasper Ridge Biological Preserve and at the Año Nuevo State Park. He is also an avid photographer, traveler (to seven continents), and jumper. He currently lives in Palo Alto, California with his wife and three sons.

Courses Taught
The Stanford Safari (2009 and 2013)
Smallpox: Lethal Legacy, Forbidding Future (2010)
The Coming Influenza Pandemic (2011)
Measles Sneezes, Things That go Mumps in the Night (2012)
Viruses in the News (2014, 2016, 2018, 2021)
Humans and Viruses 
Human Virology Inquiry Project (2016-2017)

Overseas Seminars
Dr. Siegel has led overseas seminars in the following places: 
Tanzania
Tasmania
England
Madagascar
The Pantanal

Publications
Lee, Yu-Jin, D. Scott Smith, Vivek A. Rao, Robert David Siegel, Jon Kosek, Carol A. Glaser, and Alexander C. Flint. [<https://www.hindawi.com/journals/cricc/2011/562516/ "Fatal H1N1-Related Acute Necrotizing Encephalopathy in an Adult."] Case Reports in Critical Care 2011 (2011): 1-4. Web. 19 Mar. 2017.
Lim, J. K., D. Wooten, Robert David Siegel, and R. C. Cheung. "Amantadine in Treatment of Chronic Hepatitis C Virus Infection?" Journal of Viral Hepatitis 12.5 (2005): 445-55. Web. 19 Mar. 2017.

Book Chapters
“Classification of Human Viruses” Siegel, Robert in Principles and Practice of Pediatric Infectious Diseases, Long et al., editors 5th edition        in press; 4th edition – 2012; 3rd edition with 2008 (coauthored with Prober, C). Elsevier Publisher
“Vaccines that Prevent Virally-Induced Cancer” Siegel, Robert in University Success: Transition Level. Zwier, Lawrence (Series Editor), Pearson Education Incorporated, Hoboken, NJ 2017.
“Cows, Cannibals, and Crystals – Explaining the Mechanism of Prional Disease” Siegel, Robert in University Success: Transition Level. Zwier, Lawrence (Series Editor), Pearson Education Incorporated, Hoboken, NJ 2017.
“Are Viruses Alive” Siegel, Robert in University Success: Transition Level. Lockwood, Robyn Brinks (Series Editor), Pearson Education Incorporated, Hoboken, NJ 2017.

Travel Articles
Siegel, Robert "Issues of Development in Northern Tanzania: One Day" Abroad, Winter, 2013 
Van Maanen, Gert; and Robert David Siegel "In Darwins voetspoor" Bionieuws, December, 2008 pp. 22–23, (in Dutch) 
Siegel, Robert "Kilimanjaro: The Top of the World", The Stanford Alpine Journal, 2002-2003 edition

Published Poems
“An Ode to Jenner and Blossom” Oxford Magazine No 290, Trinity Term 2009, p 17.
“Open the Window and Influenza” Oxford Magazine No 289, Trinity Term 2009, p18

Awards
Walter Gores Award
Henry Kaiser Award
ASSU teaching award

References

External links 
 Robert Siegel CAP Profile for Stanford School of Medicine
 Robert Siegel Microbiology Immunology Department Profile
 Robert Siegel Woods Institute Profile
 Robert Siegel Interview with Stanford Daily about BOSP
 Robert Siegel Personal Website

Living people
Stanford University faculty
Place of birth missing (living people)
Year of birth missing (living people)